Wiesław Alojzy Mering (born 10 December 1945 in Żukowo) is a Polish Roman Catholic bishop.

Ordained to the priesthood on 21 May 1972, Mering was named bishop of the Roman Catholic Diocese of Włocławek, Poland on 25 March 2003.

References 

1945 births
Living people
People from Kartuzy County
Bishops of Kujawy and Włocławek